Ahmedabad railway division is one of the six railway divisions under Western Railway zone of Indian Railways. This railway division was formed on 1 April 2003 and its headquarter is located at Ahmedabad in the state of Gujarat of India.

Mumbai WR railway division, Vadodara railway division, Bhavnagar railway division, Rajkot railway division and Ratlam railway division are the other five railway divisions under WR Zone headquartered at Churchgate, Mumbai.

List of railway stations and towns 
The list includes the stations under the Ahemdabad railway division and their station category.

Stations closed for Passengers -

References

 
Divisions of Indian Railways
2003 establishments in Gujarat